Windy City Riot was a professional wrestling event produced by New Japan Pro-Wrestling (NJPW). It took place on April 16, 2022, at the Odeum Expo Center in Villa Park, Illinois.

Nine matches were contested at the event. In the main event, Jon Moxley defeated Will Ospreay. In other prominent matches, Tomohiro Ishii defeated Minoru Suzuki, Juice Robinson, David Finlay and Brody King defeated Jonah, Shane Haste and Bad Dude Tito in a Chicago Street Fight, and Tom Lawlor defeated Yuji Nagata to retain the Strong Openweight Championship. The event also saw Shota Umino's return to the company from excursion in a losing effort to Jay White.

This was the final event held at the Odeum Expo Center, as the venue permanently closed in May 2022.

Storylines 
Windy City Riot featured nine professional wrestling matches that involve different wrestlers from pre-existing scripted feuds and storylines. Wrestlers portrayed villains, heroes, or less distinguishable characters in the scripted events that built tension and culminated in a wrestling match or series of matches.

Results

References 

2022 in professional wrestling
Events in Villa Park, Illinois
New Japan Pro-Wrestling shows
Professional wrestling in the United States